Samantha Marie-Ann Brand (born 16 June 1988) is an American-born Haitian footballer who plays as a midfielder. She was a member of the Haiti women's national team.

References

External links 
 
Player domestic stats  at SvFF

1988 births
Living people
Citizens of Haiti through descent
Haitian women's footballers
Women's association football midfielders
Haiti women's international footballers
Competitors at the 2014 Central American and Caribbean Games
Samantha Brand
Haitian expatriate footballers
Haitian expatriate sportspeople in Iceland
Expatriate women's footballers in Iceland
Haitian expatriate sportspeople in Sweden
Expatriate women's footballers in Sweden
People from Stanislaus County, California
Sportspeople from San Bernardino County, California
Soccer players from California
American women's soccer players
San Francisco Dons women's soccer players
African-American women's soccer players
American sportspeople of Haitian descent
American expatriate women's soccer players
Samantha Brand
American expatriate sportspeople in Sweden
21st-century African-American sportspeople
21st-century African-American women
20th-century African-American people
20th-century African-American women